Shahabad was a Lok Sabha parliamentary constituency in Uttar Pradesh.

Members of Parliament

See also
 Shahabad
 List of Constituencies of the Lok Sabha

Former Lok Sabha constituencies of Uttar Pradesh
2008 disestablishments in India
Constituencies disestablished in 2008
Politics of Hardoi district
Former constituencies of the Lok Sabha